Toro was a Canadian men’s magazine. It was named by its owner, Christopher Bratty. The editorial was overseen by Derek Finkle. Cameron Williamson and Alicia Kowalewski were the creative and art directors, respectively.

Brand lineage
In 2003, TORO magazine entered into the Canadian marketplace as a glossy men's lifestyle publication, distributed by The Globe and Mail as well as by subscription and newsstand. During its four-year run, TORO garnered more than 60 National Magazine Award nominations. In 2007, TORO magazine suspended publication.

A web-only version of TORO launched in May 2008, co-founded by Christopher Bratty and William Morassutti, the founding editor. The digital TORO reached a peak monthly readership of 543,000 unique visitors in October, 2010 (ComScore/October, 2010) and operated for five years, until 2013, at which point publication was suspended.

Print covers
Sam Roberts (April/May 2003)
Donald Sutherland (June/July 2003)
Ryan Gosling (August/September 2003)
Estella Warren (October/November 2003)
Melissa Auf der Maur (Winter 2003)
Jessica Paré (April 2004)
Barry Pepper (March 2004)
Ryan Reynolds (Winter 2004)
Rachel Blanchard (September 2004)
Dita Von Teese (October 2004)
Jesse Palmer (November 2004)
Daniel Igali (Summer 2004)
David Cronenberg (Summer 2004)
Sofía Vergara (October 2005)
Steve Nash (November 2005)
Elisha Cuthbert (May 2005)
Kristin Kreuk (Summer 2005)
Scott Speedman (April 2005)
Wilmer Valderrama (Winter 2005)
Paul Walker (March 2006)
Gretchen Mol (April 2006)
Mía Maestro (May 2006)
Jason Bay (Summer 2006)
Elizabeth Banks (September 2006)
John Cena (October 2006)
Ricky Williams (November 2006)
Beau Garrett (Winter 2006)
Hayden Christensen (March 2007)

Print Talking To's
Rick Marin (April/May 2003)
Gord Downie (June/July 2003)
Bryan Adams (August/September 2003)
Phil Esposito (October/November 2003)
David Bowie (Winter 2003)
Éric Gagné (April 2004)
Ed Robertson, Mia Kirshner (March 2004)
Chandra West (Winter 2004)
Jessalyn Gilsig (September 2004)
Brian Wilson (October 2004)
Tricia Helfer (May 2004)
Julie Delpy, Solitair, Ivana Santilli, Mitchie Mee, Buck 65, Kyprios, Graph Noble, Abs&Fase (Summer 2004)
Ashley Scott (September 2005)
Sheryl Crow, Jay Baruchel, Tom Green, Will Arnett (October 2005)
Franz Ferdinand, Maggie Grace, Benz Antoine (November 2005)
Paul Haggis (May 2005)
Kate Pierson, Justin Chatwin (May 2005)
Joel Plaskett, The Stills, The Dears, Arcade Fire, Melissa George (April 2005)
Emilie de Ravin (March 2006)
The Streets (May 2006)
MSTRKRFT, Josh Dean, Leslie Bibb (Summer 2006)
John Lithgow, Justin Timberlake, Emily Haines, Sarah Carter (October 2006)
Gordon Moakes (March 2007)

Print TORO Woman
Joanne Kelly (April/May 2003)
Esthero (June/July 2003)
Sarah Polley (August/September 2003)
Kristin Booth (October/November 2003)
Caroline Dhavernas (Winter 2003)
Lindy Booth (April 2004)
Feist (March 2004)
Erica Durance (Winter 2004)
Melyssa Ford (September 2004)
Tamara Hope (October 2004)
Evelyn Ng (November 2004)
Tanya Reid (May 2004)
Françoise Yip (Summer 2004)
Katheryn Winnick (September 2005)
Kristin Adams (October 2005)
Sarah Carter (November 2005)
Karen Cliche (May 2005)
Cobie Smulders (Summer 2005)
Emily Van Camp (April 2005)
Gina Holden (March 2006)
Tania Saulnier (April 2006)
Vanessa Lengies, Peregrym (May 2006)
Michelle Lombardo (Summer 2006)
Natassia Malthe (September 2006)
Shelby Fenner (October 2006)
Crystal Lowe (Winter 2006)
Brooke Nevin (March 2007)

Web TORO Woman
Adrienne Kress (January 2009)

References

External links
 TOROmagazine.com Official website

Men's magazines published in Canada
Online magazines published in Canada
Defunct magazines published in Canada
Magazines established in 2003
Magazines disestablished in 2007
Defunct websites